Jacques-Guillaume Legrand (9 May 1753 – 10 November 1807) was a French architect and critic.

Early years
Jacques-Guillaume Legrand was born on 9 May 1753 in Paris.
He studied at the Louis-le-Grand College, then entered the National School of Bridges and Roads (École Nationale des Ponts et Chaussées, ENPC), where his ability caught the attention of Jean-Rodolphe Perronet, the founder of the school.
While still at the ENPC he also took lessons from Jacques-François Blondel at the Royal Academy of Architecture (Académie royale d'architecture).
It was here that he met Jacques Molinos, with whom he would often work in the future.
Molinos was ten years older.
Legrand learned neoclassical concepts from Blondel.
After Blondel died he took lessons from Charles-Louis Clérisseau, whose daughter he married.

Legrand and Molinos visited Italy together, where Legrand examined the monuments using the book by Antoine Desgodetz as his guide.
He made notes in this book, and corrected some errors.
He planned to use the notes for a revised edition, but he unwisely entrusted them to another man who passed them off as his own.
The two friends visited the temples of Paestum, and were going to visit Magna Graecia when they were recalled to France.

Career

In 1783 Legrand and Molinos built a dome over the courtyard of the Corn Exchange (Halle aux blés, Paris), which Nicolas Le Camus de Mézières (1721–1789) had built in 1763 with a circular rotunda and open courtyard colonnade.
The dome was of pine planks sheathed in copper and lead and topped by a lantern of iron.
The design was based on the principles of Philibert de l'Orme.
They used glazed panels to introduce light into the courtyard.
Thomas Jefferson commented on the ingenious design.

Legrand undertook public and private commissions, and also wrote as an art critic.
The Minister of the Interior gave Legrand the task of restoring the monuments of Paris.
The prefect of the department assigned him to the committee charged with supervising buildings.
Legrand and Molinos built the Cloth Hall in 1786, destroyed in 1855.
The cloth market vault was supported on terracotta tubes, and the roof was covered with copper.
In its day the cloth market roof was almost as well known as the dome of the corn market.
Legrand and Molinos worked on developing the Paris markets, and also designed the Théâtre Feydeau in the rue de Richelieu.

Legrand was charged with restoring the Église de Saint-Denis and the sepulcher of the kings, and moved to the site to supervise the work.
He became ill from overexertion, and died in Saint-Denis on 10 November 1808.
He was buried in the cemetery of Auteuil.

Publications

Legrand began work on a huge General History of Architecture, but it was not completed or published.
He published:

Notes

Sources

1753 births
1807 deaths
Architects from Paris
18th-century French architects
19th-century French architects
French architectural historians